Lake Placid is a reservoir on the Guadalupe River  southwest of the town of Seguin in Guadalupe County, Texas. The reservoir was formed in 1928 by the construction of a dam on the river.   Management of the dam and lake was assumed by the Guadalupe-Blanco River Authority on May 1, 1963. Lake Placid is a venue for outdoor recreation, including fishing, boating, and swimming.

Fish and plant life
Lake Placid has been stocked with species of fish intended to improve the utility of the reservoir for recreational fishing. Fish present in Lake Placid include catfish, white crappie, sunfish, and largemouth and spotted bass. Vegetation in the lake includes cattail, pondweed, American lotus, spatterdock, rushes, water hyacinth, water lettuce, and hydrilla.

Recreational uses
The only free public boat ramp and lake access is available off exit 605 of Interstate Highway 10.

External links
Lake Placid - Guadalupe-Blanco River Authority
Lake Placid - Texas Parks & Wildlife

Placid
Protected areas of Guadalupe County, Texas
Guadalupe-Blanco River Authority
Bodies of water of Guadalupe County, Texas